This is a list of formations of the United States Army during the World War II. Many of these formations still exist today, though many by different designations. Included are formations that were placed on rolls, but never organized, as well as "phantom" formations used in the Allied Operation Quicksilver deception of 1944—these are marked accordingly.

Army groups
  1st Army Group ("phantom" formation)
  6th Army Group
  12th Army Group
  15th Army Group

Field armies
  First Allied Airborne Army
  First United States Army
  Second United States Army
  Third United States Army
  Fourth United States Army
  Fifth United States Army
  Sixth United States Army
  Seventh United States Army
  Eighth United States Army
  Ninth United States Army
  Tenth United States Army
  Fourteenth United States Army ("phantom" formation)
  Fifteenth United States Army

Corps
  I Corps
  I Armored Corps
  II Corps
  III Corps
  IV Corps
  V Corps
  VI Corps
  VII Corps
  VIII Corps
  IX Corps
  X Corps
  XI Corps
  XII Corps
  XIII Corps
  XIV Corps
  XV Corps
  XVI Corps
  XVIII Airborne Corps
  XIX Corps
  XX Corps
  XXI Corps
  XXII Corps
  XXIII Corps
  XXIV Corps
  XXXIII Corps ("phantom" formation)
  XXXVI Corps
 XXXVII Corps ("phantom" formation)

Divisions
Airborne, armored, cavalry, infantry, and mountain divisions are grouped separately. The numbering system for the airborne and mountain divisions are a continuation of the infantry numbering system—"phantom" formations are an exception to that numbering system.

Airborne divisions
  6th Airborne Division ("phantom" formation)
  9th Airborne Division ("phantom" formation)
  11th Airborne Division
  13th Airborne Division
 15th Airborne Division (unorganized)
  17th Airborne Division
  18th Airborne Division ("phantom" formation)
  21st Airborne Division ("phantom" formation)
  82nd Airborne Division
  101st Airborne Division
  135th Airborne Division ("phantom" formation)

Armored divisions
  1st Armored Division
  2nd Armored Division
  3rd Armored Division
  4th Armored Division
  5th Armored Division
  6th Armored Division
  7th Armored Division
  8th Armored Division
  9th Armored Division
  10th Armored Division
  11th Armored Division
  12th Armored Division
  13th Armored Division
  14th Armored Division
  15th Armored Division ("phantom" formation)
  16th Armored Division
 18th Armored Division (constituted but never activated)
 19th Armored Division (constituted but never activated)
  20th Armored Division
 21st Armored Division (constituted but never activated)
 22nd Armored Division (constituted but never activated)
  25th Armored Division ("phantom" formation)
  39th Armored Division ("phantom" formation)

Cavalry divisions
  1st Cavalry Division
  2nd Cavalry Division

Infantry divisions
  1st Infantry Division
  2nd Infantry Division
  3rd Infantry Division
  4th Infantry Division
  5th Infantry Division
  6th Infantry Division
  7th Infantry Division
  8th Infantry Division
  9th Infantry Division
  11th Infantry Division ("phantom" formation)
  14th Infantry Division ("phantom" formation)
  17th Infantry Division ("phantom" formation)
  22nd Infantry Division ("phantom" formation)
  24th Infantry Division
  25th Infantry Division
  26th Infantry Division
  27th Infantry Division
  28th Infantry Division
  29th Infantry Division
  30th Infantry Division
  31st Infantry Division
  32nd Infantry Division
  33rd Infantry Division
  34th Infantry Division
  35th Infantry Division
  36th Infantry Division
  37th Infantry Division
  38th Infantry Division
  40th Infantry Division
  41st Infantry Division
  42nd Infantry Division
  43rd Infantry Division
  44th Infantry Division
  45th Infantry Division
 46th Infantry Division ("phantom" formation)
  48th Infantry Division ("phantom" formation)
  50th Infantry Division ("phantom" formation)
  55th Infantry Division ("phantom" formation)
  59th Infantry Division ("phantom" formation)
 61st Infantry Division (constituted but never activated)
 62nd Infantry Division (constituted but never activated)
  63rd Infantry Division
  65th Infantry Division
  66th Infantry Division
 67th Infantry Division (constituted but never activated)
 68th Infantry Division (constituted but never activated)
  69th Infantry Division
  70th Infantry Division
  71st Infantry Division
 72nd Infantry Division (constituted but never activated)
 73rd Infantry Division (constituted but never activated)
 74th Infantry Division (constituted but never activated)
  75th Infantry Division
  76th Infantry Division
  77th Infantry Division
  78th Infantry Division
  79th Infantry Division
  80th Infantry Division
  81st Infantry Division
  83rd Infantry Division
  84th Infantry Division
  85th Infantry Division
  86th Infantry Division
  87th Infantry Division
  88th Infantry Division
  89th Infantry Division
  90th Infantry Division
  91st Infantry Division
  92nd Infantry Division
  93rd Infantry Division
  94th Infantry Division
  95th Infantry Division
  96th Infantry Division
  97th Infantry Division
  98th Infantry Division
  99th Infantry Division
  100th Infantry Division
  102nd Infantry Division
  103rd Infantry Division
  104th Infantry Division
 105th Infantry Division (constituted but never activated)
  106th Infantry Division
 107th Infantry Division (constituted but never activated)
 108th Infantry Division ("phantom" formation - activated following the war as the 108th Airborne Division)
 109th Infantry Division ("phantom" formation)
 112th Infantry Division ("phantom" formation)
  119th Infantry Division ("phantom" formation)
 125th Infantry Division ("phantom" formation)
  130th Infantry Division ("phantom" formation)
  141st Infantry Division ("phantom" formation)
  157th Infantry Division ("phantom" formation)
  Americal Division
  Philippine Division

Mountain divisions
  10th Mountain Division

See also
 
 United States in World War II (disambiguation)

Formations
United States Army formations
World War II
Formations